All You Can Eat is the third studio album by American glam metal band Steel Panther, released on April 1, 2014 on the independent label Open E Music via Kobalt Label Services. The album was officially announced September 2013. The first single from the album is "Party Like Tomorrow is the End of the World". The second single, "The Burden of Being Wonderful", was released January 21, 2014. The third single, "Gloryhole", was released in April 2014 on Steel Panther's VEVO channel. 

On March 26, 2014 the album was leaked online and available for downloading on various websites, most likely after being streamed by the German tabloid Bild. The online stream was approved by Steel Panther.

The album's artwork is a parody of the mural painting The Last Supper by Leonardo da Vinci.

Track listing
The track listing of All You Can Eat was announced on 13 January 2014.

Personnel
Steel Panther
Michael Starr – lead vocals
Satchel – guitars, acoustic guitar, backing vocals
Lexxi Foxx – bass, backing vocals
Stix Zadinia – drums, piano, backing vocals
Additional musicians
Vivian Campbell (of Def Leppard) – guitar solo on "Gangbang at the Old Folks Home"
Kiara Ana Perico – Violin and viola on "The Burden of Being Wonderful"
Production
Jay Ruston & Steel Panther – production
Jay Ruston – engineering & mixing
Nick Rucker – additional overdub engineering
Ara Sarkasian – assistant engineer
James Ingram – additional mix engineer & Pro Tools editor
Paul Logus – Mastering at Taloowa Mastering, New York
David Jackson – photography & art design

Recorded at Clear Lake Audio, Burbank, California. Overdubs mixed at TRS West, Sherman Oaks, California.

Charts

References

2014 albums
Steel Panther albums
Universal Republic Records albums